Bucculatrix spectabilis is a moth in the family Bucculatricidae first described by Annette Frances Braun in 1963. It is found in North America, where it has been recorded from Arizona.

The wingspan is about 7.5 mm.

References

Bucculatricidae
Moths described in 1963
Moths of North America
Taxa named by Annette Frances Braun